Volta is an unincorporated community and census-designated place (CDP) in Merced County, California, United States. The population was 366 at the 2020 census, up from 246 at the 2010 census.

From 1858 to 1861, Lone Willow Station a swing station for the Butterfield Overland Mail, was located east of here on the west bank of Mud Slough, 18 miles east of the St. Louis Ranch Station and 13 miles northwest of Temple's Ranch station.

A post office operated at Volta from 1890 to 1972. The name was from the Volta Improvement Company.

Geography
Volta is in southwestern Merced County, between Los Banos to the southeast and Santa Nella to the west. It is on the western side of California's Central Valley.

Demographics
The 2010 United States Census reported that Volta had a population of 246. The racial makeup of Volta was 201 (81.7%) White, 7 (2.8%) African American, 0 (0.0%) Native American, 1 (0.4%) Asian, 4 (1.6%) Pacific Islander, 29 (11.8%) from other races, and 4 (1.6%) from two or more races. Hispanic or Latino of any race were 132 persons (53.7%).

The Census reported that 246 people (100% of the population) lived in households, 0 (0%) lived in non-institutionalized group quarters, and 0 (0%) were institutionalized.

There were 83 households, out of which 31 (37.3%) had children under the age of 18 living in them, 47 (56.6%) were opposite-sex married couples living together, 5 (6.0%) had a female householder with no husband present, 7 (8.4%) had a male householder with no wife present.  There were 8 (9.6%) unmarried opposite-sex partnerships, and 1 (1.2%) same-sex married couples or partnerships. 17 households (20.5%) were made up of individuals, and 7 (8.4%) had someone living alone who was 65 years of age or older. The average household size was 2.96.  There were 59 families (71.1% of all households); the average family size was 3.47.

The population was spread out, with 59 people (24.0%) under the age of 18, 31 people (12.6%) aged 18 to 24, 61 people (24.8%) aged 25 to 44, 68 people (27.6%) aged 45 to 64, and 27 people (11.0%) who were 65 years of age or older.  The median age was 36.6 years. For every 100 females, there were 101.6 males.  For every 100 females age 18 and over, there were 107.8 males.

There were 106 housing units at an average density of 23.9 per square mile (9.2/km), of which 43 (51.8%) were owner-occupied, and 40 (48.2%) were occupied by renters. The homeowner vacancy rate was 2.2%; the rental vacancy rate was 11.1%.  114 people (46.3% of the population) lived in owner-occupied housing units and 132 people (53.7%) lived in rental housing units.

References

Census-designated places in Merced County, California
Butterfield Overland Mail in California
Census-designated places in California